)
|pastnames  
 WWF Intercontinental (Heavyweight) Championship(1979–2002)
 WWE Intercontinental Championship(2002, 2003–present)
}}
The WWE Intercontinental Championship is a professional wrestling championship created and promoted by the American promotion WWE, currently defended on the SmackDown brand division. It is one of two secondary championships for WWE's main roster, along with the WWE United States Championship on Raw. The current champion is Gunther, who is in his first reign.

The championship was established by the then-World Wrestling Federation (WWF) on September 1, 1979, as a result of the WWF North American Heavyweight Championship being unified with an apocryphal South American Heavyweight Championship, with Pat Patterson  as the inaugural champion. It is the third-oldest championship currently active in WWE, behind the WWE Championship (1963) and United States Championship (1975), but the second-longest tenured championship, as WWE has only owned the U.S. championship since 2001. Although generally contested in the midcard at WWE shows, it has been defended in the main event of pay-per-views including WrestleMania VI, SummerSlam in 1992, the third and eighth In Your House shows, Backlash in 2001, and at Extreme Rules in 2018. It has been called a "stepping stone" to a WWE world championship.

In November 2001, the then-WCW United States Championship was unified into the Intercontinental Championship. In 2002, after the introduction of the first brand split, it became exclusive to Raw and the WWF was renamed WWE. Later that year, the European and Hardcore championships were unified into the Intercontinental Championship, which itself was unified into the World Heavyweight Championship. The next year, it was reactivated for Raw, followed by the United States Championship's reactivation as a counterpart championship on SmackDown. The Intercontinental Championship has switched between brands over the years, usually as a result of the WWE Draft; the 2019 Superstar Shake-up moved the title to SmackDown.

Etymology 
The term "intercontinental" in the title originally referred to North and South America. In 1985, the championship belt design changed, the centerplate now centered on the Atlantic Ocean, in a map including western Africa and Europe. On April 7, 1989, the championship was first defended outside of North America, by Rick Rude against The Ultimate Warrior in Turin, Italy. On March 30, 1991, Mr. Perfect made the first Asian defense against The Texas Tornado at a WWF co-promotion with Super World of Sports in Tokyo, Japan. It first came to Africa on April 6, 1997, when champion Rocky Maivia pinned Savio Vega in Durban, South Africa. Shelton Benjamin made the first Australian defense on April 7, 2005, pinning Gene Snitsky in Brisbane.

History 

WWF North American Heavyweight Champion Pat Patterson became the inaugural champion on September 1, 1979. It was said he had unified his title with the South American Heavyweight Championship, in a tournament in Rio de Janeiro, although both the tournament and South American Championship were entirely fictional.

On April 1, 1990, at WrestleMania VI, Intercontinental Heavyweight Champion The Ultimate Warrior defeated WWF World Heavyweight Champion Hulk Hogan to win the world title; so the Intercontinental Heavyweight Championship was vacated for the first time soon after. Mr. Perfect then won a tournament to crown a new Intercontinental Heavyweight Champion.

On October 17, 1999, Chyna became the only woman to hold the Intercontinental Championship by defeating Jeff Jarrett at No Mercy. Following the World Wrestling Federation's (WWF) purchase of World Championship Wrestling (WCW) in March 2001, the title was unified with the WCW United States Championship at Survivor Series, causing the United States Championship to become inactive. Then-United States Champion Edge defeated then-Intercontinental Champion Test.

In 2002, after the first brand split had begun and the WWF was renamed WWE, Raw general manager Eric Bischoff began unifying his brand's singles championships. On July 22, 2002, the Intercontinental Championship was unified with the European Championship in a ladder match, in which then-Intercontinental Champion Rob Van Dam defeated then-European Champion Jeff Hardy. On August 19, 2002, Bischoff made a six-minute gauntlet match for the Hardcore Championship, with the winner facing Van Dam in a second unification match the next week on Raw. Tommy Dreamer successfully retained his title in that match, and lost to Van Dam in a hardcore match the next week. As a result of the victories over Hardy and Dreamer, Van Dam is regarded as the last European and Hardcore champion in WWE history; these were his first and fourth reigns with those respective titles. On September 30, 2002, Bischoff scheduled a match to unify the Intercontinental Championship with the recently created Raw-exclusive World Heavyweight Championship. The unification match took place at No Mercy the following month and saw then-World Heavyweight Champion Triple H defeat then-Intercontinental Champion Kane, making him the Raw brand's sole male singles champion.

Over Bischoff's objections, Raw co-general manager Stone Cold Steve Austin reactivated the Intercontinental Championship on the May 5, 2003 episode of Raw and declared any former champion on the Raw roster eligible to enter a battle royal at Judgment Day for the title. Christian won the battle royal to win the championship and restore a secondary singles title for Raw wrestlers to compete for. Eventually, WWE did the same thing for SmackDown and created a separate set of titles for that brand; for its secondary title, SmackDown reactivated the United States Championship that had been unified with the Intercontinental Championship in 2001, placing the WWE name on it while claiming the lineage of the old WCW title of the same name (much as they did with the Cruiserweight Championship when that became WWE exclusive).

On October 2, 2011, at Hell in a Cell, Cody Rhodes introduced a modified version of the classic championship belt design with the white strap, with the modern WWE "scratch logo" and other embellishments. Following the end of the first brand split on August 29, 2011, the title could be defended on both Raw and SmackDown. On August 18, 2014, the Intercontinental Championship belt, along with all other pre-existing championship belts in WWE at the time, received a minor update, replacing the long-standing scratch logo with WWE's current logo that was originally used for the WWE Network. On May 31, 2015, the championship was contested in an Elimination Chamber match for the first time.

In July 2016, WWE reintroduced the brand split. During the 2016 draft, then-Intercontinental Champion The Miz was drafted to SmackDown. Just days later, he successfully defended the title against Raw draftee Darren Young at Battleground, making the title exclusive to SmackDown. During the following year's Superstar Shake-up, Intercontinental Champion Dean Ambrose was moved to the Raw brand, making the title exclusive to Raw. Two years later during the 2019 WWE Superstar Shake-up, Intercontinental Champion Finn Bálor moved to SmackDown, making the title exclusive back to SmackDown. Later that year, the NXT brand, formerly WWE's developmental territory, became WWE's third major brand when it was moved to the USA Network in September, thus making the NXT North American Championship a third secondary title for the WWE.

On November 22, 2019, episode of SmackDown, Sami Zayn presented a new belt design to champion Shinsuke Nakamura. The redesigned Intercontinental Championship returned to being on a black strap with an entirely new center plate with an irregular shape. The center portion of the center plate features an oval-shape. The top half of the oval says "Intercontinental" and the bottom half says "Champion"; the word "Heavyweight" sits in a banner on the inner side of the oval above the word "Champion". At the center of the oval is a diamond shape, representing a wrestling ring viewed from above, with the WWE logo over a globe. On the sides of the center, plate is two halves of the globe. The left side features the continents of North and South America as well as Africa and Europe, while the globe on the left shows Asia and Australia; both globes show a portion of Antarctica. The rest of the center plate is filled with ornamentation. Like the majority of WWE's other championships, the belt features two side plates with a removable center section that can be customized with the champion's logos; the default side plates consist of the WWE logo over a globe.

Tournaments

WWF Intercontinental Heavyweight Championship Tournament (1990)
The WWF Intercontinental Heavyweight Championship Tournament was a tournament to decide a new WWF Intercontinental Heavyweight Champion after previous champion Ultimate Warrior was required to vacate the title after he defeated Hulk Hogan for the WWF World Heavyweight Championship at WrestleMania VI.

WWF Intercontinental Championship Tournament (1996)
The WWF Intercontinental Championship Tournament was a tournament to decide a new WWF Intercontinental Champion after previous champion Ahmed Johnson forfeited the title. He suffered (kayfabe) injuries to both kidneys when he was attacked by the debuting Faarooq after winning an 11-man battle royal.

WWF Intercontinental Championship Tournament (1997)
The tournament to determine the new WWF Intercontinental Champion after former champion Stone Cold Steve Austin forfeited the belt after his neck injury. The tournament was held between September 8 and October 5, 1997, with the finals occurring on October 5 at the pay-per-view. The tournament brackets were:

Notes:
1

WWF Intercontinental Championship Tournament (1998)
The WWF Intercontinental Championship Tournament was a tournament to decide a new WWF Intercontinental Champion after previous champion Triple H vacated the title due to injury.

WWE Intercontinental Championship #1 Contender's Tournament (2008)
A tournament was announced to crown a new #1 contender for William Regal's WWE Intercontinental Championship. CM Punk won the tournament by defeating Rey Mysterio in the tournament final at Armageddon.

WWE Intercontinental Championship Tournament (2010)
The WWE Intercontinental Championship Tournament was a tournament to crown a new Intercontinental Champion. On May 7, 2010, after failed attempts of getting Intercontinental Champion Drew McIntyre to stop attacking Matt Hardy, Smackdown General Manager Theodore Long fired McIntyre and vacated the title. The following week, Kofi Kingston won a tournament to become the new champion, but Mr. McMahon reverted Long's decision. Due to the decision by Mr. McMahon, the vacancy of the title and Kingston's championship win are not recognized as WWE continued to recognize McIntyre as champion during that period. At Over the Limit, Kingston defeated McIntyre to win his second official Intercontinental Championship.

WWE Intercontinental Championship Tournament (2020) 
On May 12, 2020, the Intercontinental Championship was declared vacant after champion Sami Zayn elected to refrain from competing during the COVID-19 pandemic. A tournament to crown a new champion was then set to begin on the May 15 episode of SmackDown.

† Neither Jeff Hardy nor Elias were able to compete in the semifinals, as Elias was (kayfabe) injured in a car crash and Hardy was accused of causing it and arrested. AJ Styles and Daniel Bryan were given the option of having a bye in the tournament. Styles opted for the bye to automatically advance to the final on June 12 while Bryan opted to have a new opponent; Sheamus subsequently won a battle royal to qualify for the vacant spot in the semifinals against Bryan that night.

Brand designation history 
Following the brand split on March 25, 2002, all titles in WWE became exclusive to either the Raw brand or SmackDown brand. The brand split was discontinued on August 29, 2011, and revived on July 19, 2016. The following is a list of dates indicating the transitions of the Intercontinental Championship between the Raw and SmackDown brands.

Reigns 

The inaugural champion was Pat Patterson who, as the WWF North American Heavyweight Champion in September 1979 was also declared "South American Heavyweight Champion" after allegedly winning a tournament in Rio de Janeiro. Patterson unified the two championships into the Intercontinental Championship. Since then, there have been 89 different champions. Chris Jericho has the most reigns with nine. Pedro Morales held the championship for a record total of 619 days and The Honky Tonk Man had the longest uninterrupted reign at 454 days, from June 2, 1987, until August 29, 1988. Dean Douglas had the shortest reign at just 13 minutes 52 seconds. Chyna is the only woman in WWE history to win the title. The youngest champion was Jeff Hardy, who won the championship at 23 years old, while the oldest champion was Ric Flair, who won the championship at Unforgiven in 2005 at the age of 56. There have been 10 vacancies throughout the title's history.

Gunther is the current champion in his first reign. He defeated Ricochet on the June 10, 2022 episode of SmackDown in Baton Rouge, Louisiana.

Reception
The Intercontinental Championship's early years have been praised. Samuel Kendall of Comic Book Resources lauded the championship during this era, stating: "It was a foregone conclusion that the Intercontinental Champion was the workhorse of the company and the next in line for the World Heavyweight Championship." Steve Cook of 411Mania wrote that "nearly anybody that was a big deal in WWE held the championship at some point." Steve Austin said he considered the Intercontinental Championship to be as important as the world titles and he remains in possession of the physical belt that represented the championship during his reign because of its historical importance. 

In the 2010s, WWE was criticized for its booking of the Intercontinental Champions. Chris Jericho said that WWE promoter Vince McMahon told him that "nobody fucking cares about the Intercontinental Championship" after he asked to be placed in a match for the title at WrestleMania 29 in 2013. Also in 2013, Darren Gutteridge of Pro Wrestling Dot Net wrote that the "title has proven an albatross for the past decade, with almost all title holders doomed to tread water, usually only beating people decisively when the title is on the line". The albatross metaphor was also used to describe the title in 2014 by James Caldwell of Pro Wrestling Torch, while Dave Meltzer of the Wrestling Observer said that year that "the [Intercontinental] title isn't booked to mean much." Various commentators in 2014 and 2015, including from The Baltimore Sun, Rolling Stone, PWInsider, and Pro Wrestling Dot Net have pointed out that the Intercontinental Champion often loses non-title matches, while Mike Tedesco of Wrestleview questioned how Intercontinental Champions losing too much is supposed to bring prestige to the title. 

The championship continued to receive criticism into the 2020s. Kendall panned the recent reigns as forgettable and wrote that the title had "turned into a prop to be lugged around, rather than a title that should bestow prestige." Cook wrote that it had been "treated as something of an afterthought" for the previous two decades. The championship was only defended on two pay-per-views in 2021 and was not defended at any within the first quarter of 2022, including WrestleMania 38; its absence on the premiere event was widely criticized by fans.

After Vince McMahon retired on July 22, 2022, the championship has been featured more prominently after Paul “Triple H” Levesque (a five-time Intercontinental Champion) took over as Head of Creative. The championship has been featured in the main event of numerous episodes of Smackdown, and has even received a five-star rating from Dave Meltzer between champion Gunther and challenger Sheamus at Clash at the Castle. It was the second WWE five-star match in the 2020s, as well as the second time in the title's history to receive such a rating. The first one being Razor Ramon vs. Shawn Michaels at WrestleMania X in 1994.

Notes

References

External links 
 Official WWE Intercontinental Title History
 Wrestling-Titles.com: Intercontinental Championship
 WWE Intercontinental Title Belts: A Guide to the Gold

Awards established in 1979
Intercontinental professional wrestling championships
WWE championships